Chambul was a type of unit used by the Tatar soldiers, mainly by Crimean Khanate and Minor Tartary. It was used, by breaking off of the main army, and attacking the opponent forces within their territory, in order to make a diversion for the main forces, as well as to establish a holdout and gain the spoils of war, including slaves.

Citations

References

Bibliography 
 Marcin Kamler (editor): Wojsko, wojna, broń by PWN Leksykon. Warsaw: Wydawnictwo Naukowe PWN, 2001, s. 69. ISBN 83-01-13506-9.

Types of military forces